Samaneh Beyrami Baher (born 12 June 1991 in Iran) is an Iranian female cross-country skier. Samaneh competed in the 2018 Winter Olympics in Pyeongchang.

References 

1991 births
Iranian female cross-country skiers
Living people
Cross-country skiers at the 2018 Winter Olympics
Olympic cross-country skiers of Iran
20th-century Iranian women
21st-century Iranian women